Airborne Express was an express delivery company and cargo airline. Headquartered in Seattle, Washington; its hub was in Wilmington, Ohio. Airborne was founded as the Airborne Flower Traffic Association of California in 1946 to fly flowers from Hawaii to the US mainland. Airborne Express was acquired by DHL in 2003. Prior to the acquisition, it rose to be the third largest private express delivery company in the United States, behind Federal Express (FedEx Express) and United Parcel Service (UPS).

History
Growth during Airborne's first 22 years was slow. Progress came slowly and competition was stiff. But in 1968, the airline known as Airbourne Freight Company, started going through some changes. The company Air Cargo Equipment Corporation developed and patented a special narrow container, known in the industry later as the "C" container (referring to its C shape), which allowed the more efficient use of space within large jet aircraft. The containers also eliminated the need to modify the cargo doors, thus saving any air-freight company that used them substantial sums of money.  It does appear that around this time, early on, that Airborne began using the more efficient containers. Known at that time as Airborne of California, the company merged with Pacific Air Freight of Seattle. The newly formed airline moved its headquarters north to Seattle and changed its name to Airborne Freight Corporation. This was the name they kept until 1980.

Growth from 1980-2008

 1980: The airline changed its name to Airborne Express Inc. after buying Midwest Air Charter. Airborne Express made history by buying the Clinton County Air Force Base in Wilmington, and became the first airline in history to own and operate an airport. A number of NAMC YS-11 twin-engined turboprop freight conversions were also purchased. From that point on, Wilmington, Ohio became the company's main freight-sorting hub.
 1988: Airborne started offering same day delivery after buying Sky Courier (now DHL SameDay) as well as forming contracts with other private logistical contractors, in every city where they operated an office. The vehicles (mostly vans), and the drivers employed by these contracted companies, were all outfitted with the colors and uniforms of the rapidly recognizable Airborne colors: gray, red and black. Around this time, Airborne Express offered a less expensive second-day package service, which was modeled after Federal Express' second-day, or "P2" (priority two) parcel service.
 1991: Airborne received awards from three major companies, including Volvo, and in 1992, the airline introduced Flight-Ready SM, a prepaid express letters and Express Pack system.
 1993: Airborne introduced the Airborne Logistics System (ALS), which provided Airborne with warehousing and distribution services.
 1994: Airborne opened the Ocean Services Division, and along with ALS, helped establish the first new film distribution program for Technicolor labs since 1944. In addition, relations were established with Vietnam.
 1995: Airborne opened a second runway at Wilmington, and Boeing 767 jets were added to the fleet. The Airborne Alliance Group took care of many departments for the company.
 1996: Airborne's stock tripled, which would later lead into a two for one stock split in February 1998. Formed that year was Airborne Brokerage Services.
 1998: Airborne entered the Fortune 500 list for the first time. Airborne's first of 30 total Boeing 767s arrived at Wilmington, and the airline won an award by The Business Consumer Guide.
 1999: Airborne@Home, an alliance with the United States Postal Service, was formed.
 2000: Carl Donaway became the company's new president, which led to many managerial changes. Also that year, Airborne started a ground service for the first time in its history.
 2001: Airborne Express launched Ground Delivery Service and 10:30 AM Delivery Service. Airborne.com launched some services of its own, including the Small Business Center and Airborne eCourier.
 August 14, 2003: Airborne shareholders approved the acquisition of Airborne Inc. by DHL of Brussels, Belgium. DHL is 100% owned by Deutsche Post World Net. The acquisition became effective the next day. DHL retained ownership of Airborne's ground operations and spun off its air operations as ABX Air, Inc.
 November 10, 2008: Global delivery company DHL announced that it is cutting 9,500 jobs as it discontinues air and ground operations within the United States. DHL said its DHL Express will continue to operate between the United States and other nations. But the company said it was dropping "domestic-only" air and ground services within the United States by Jan. 30 "to minimize future uncertainties".  DHL's 9,500 job cuts are on top of 5,400 job reductions announced earlier this year. After these job losses, between 3,000 and 4,000 employees will remain at DHL's U.S. operations, the company said.  The company also said it was shutting down all ground hubs and reducing its number of stations to 103 from 412.

Incidents and accidents 
Airborne Express has experienced seven accidents, with six of them being hull losses, and two resulting in fatalities.

 On June 11, 1979, a de Havilland Dove operated by Midwest Air Charter on behalf on Airborne Express made a belly landing at St. Louis Lambert International Airport. Both crew members survived, but the aircraft was damaged beyond repair and written off.
 On June 19, 1980, a Sud Aviation Caravelle VI-R made a hard landing at Atlanta Municipal Airport (now Hartsfield–Jackson Atlanta International Airport), causing its left main landing gear to collapse. The aircraft was caught in wake turbulence from a Lockheed L-1011 TriStar. The four occupants (three crew members and one passenger) on board survived. The aircraft was damaged beyond repair and written off.
 On February 5, 1985, a McDonnell Douglas DC-9-15 crashed after takeoff from Philadelphia International Airport. Both pilots on board survived, but the aircraft was substantially damaged and written off.
 On August 20, 1987, Airborne Express Flight 124, a McDonnell Douglas DC-9-31, was back taxiing on Runway 09/27 at Stewart International Airport during deteriorating weather condition, when an Emery Worldwide (operating as Rosenbalm Aviation Flight 074) Douglas DC-8-63F, landed on the same runway without clearance, The DC-9's tail was struck by the DC-8's wing. There were no fatalities and both aircraft were repaired and returned to service.
 On January 29, 1990, a Cessna 208 Caravan crashed after takeoff from Burlington International Airport. The pilot and the passenger, the aircraft's only occupants, were both killed. This was the first fatal accident for Airborne Express. The accident was caused by overloading of the aircraft and pilot error due to the aircraft not being de-iced before departure.
 On March 6, 1992, a NAMC YS-11A operating a training flight was damaged beyond repair and written off when it made a belly landing at the Wilmington-Airborne Airpark after the crew accidentally forgot to lower the landing gear. All three crew members on board survived.
 On December 22, 1996, Flight 827, a Douglas DC-8-63F, crashed in Narrows, Virginia while performing a flight test. All six people on board were killed. This is the airline's deadliest accident.

See also 
 List of defunct airlines of the United States
ABX Air

References

DHL
Defunct cargo airlines
Airlines established in 1980
Airlines disestablished in 2003
Defunct airlines of the United States
Defunct companies based in Seattle
Transportation companies of the United States
Cargo airlines of the United States
1946 establishments in the United States
Airlines based in Washington (state)